In anatomy, the fibular veins (also known as peroneal veins) are accompanying veins (venae comitantes) of the fibular artery.

Structure

The fibular veins are deep veins that help carry blood from the lateral compartment of the leg. They drain into the posterior tibial veins, which in turn drain into the popliteal vein. The fibular veins accompany the fibular artery.

See also
 Fibular artery
 Common fibular nerve
 Venae comitantes

Additional images

References 

Veins of the lower limb